"Naïve" is a song by British indie rock band the Kooks. It was released on 27 March 2006 as the fourth single from their debut studio album, Inside In/Inside Out (2006). "Naïve" charted at number five on the UK Singles Chart, becoming the UK's 19th-best-selling single of 2006 and earning a quadruple platinum certification from the British Phonographic Industry (BPI) in 2022. The song additionally reached number 15 in Flanders and New Zealand as well as number 22 on the US Billboard Modern Rock Tracks chart.

Music video
The official music video features Luke Pritchard singing the song whilst walking around a nightclub and reminiscing on memories of him and his girlfriend.

Track listings

UK 7-inch single
A. "Naïve"
B. "Tea and Biscuits"

UK limited-edition Minimax CD single
 "Naïve"
 "Hiding Low"

European CD single
 "Naïve"
 "I Love That Girl"
 "Naïve" (video)
 "You Don't Love Me" (live from Fopp tour video)

Australian CD single
 "Naïve"
 "Tea and Biscuits"
 "I Love That Girl"

Seeb remix
 "Naïve" (Seeb remix) – 3:08

Charts

Weekly charts

Year-end charts

Certifications

Release history

Covers
 Lily Allen—for a live session on The Jo Whiley Show. Allen's version was featured on the soundtrack for the film Angus, Thongs and Perfect Snogging. 
 Former Sugababes member Mutya Buena—as a B-side for her debut single "Real Girl". It placed at number 87 in Triple J's Hottest 100 of the Past 20 Years (1993-2013), being one of a few songs to debut in the countdown without having made a yearly list beforehand.
 Amie J—for Aldo Vanucci Presents / Good Living Records

In popular culture
"Naïve" was featured on the soundtrack for the film 17 Again (2009) and the One Tree Hill episode "Resolve", as well as on the show's third soundtrack, The Road Mix and the 2009 video game Lego Rock Band.

Actress Jodie Comer stated in a 2018 interview that "Naïve" was her favourite song as a teenager, and that she considered having the song's title tattooed across the back of her neck before realising it was a bad idea.

References

2005 songs
2006 singles
Astralwerks singles
The Kooks songs
Virgin Records singles